Denis Yakubovich (born 31 March 1988) is a Belarusian professional football player.

References

External links
 

1988 births
Living people
Belarusian footballers
Association football midfielders
FC Molodechno players
FC Dinamo Minsk players
FC Volna Pinsk players
FC Shakhtyor Soligorsk players
FC Granit Mikashevichi players
FC Slonim-2017 players
FC Slutsk players
FC Gorodeya players
FC Torpedo Minsk players
FC Smorgon players